MHk 32 Liptovský Mikuláš is a professional ice hockey team in the Slovak Extraliga, top hockey tier in Slovakia. Their home town is Liptovský Mikuláš in Slovakia. The team plays their home games at Liptovský Mikuláš Ice Stadium.

History
The club was founded in 1932. Mikuláš won the 1. SNHL first time in the 1972, but they won this league two more times in the 1974 and 1989.  In the 2017–18 season did not qualify for the playoffs.

Honours

Domestic

Slovak 1. Liga
  Runners-up (1): 2010–11
  3rd place (1): 2015–16

1st. Slovak National Hockey League
  Winners (3): 1971–72, 1973–74, 1988–89
  Runners-up (4): 1969–70, 1970–71, 1972–73, 1992–93
  3rd place (1): 1974–75

Players

Current roster

Notable players

 Ján Laco
 Jerguš Bača
 Martin Cibák
 Rudolf Huna
 Marek Bartánus
 Karol Križan
 Marek Uram

References

External links
Official website 

Liptovsky Mikulas
Liptovsky Mikulas
1932 establishments in Czechoslovakia